Mollo is a surname. Notable people with the surname include:

 Andrew Mollo (born 1940), British film designer, screenwriter and book author
 Ann Mollo (born 1933), British set decorator
 Dario Mollo, Italian musician and record producer
 John Mollo (1931–2017), British costume designer and book author
 Mike Mollo (born 1980), American professional heavyweight boxer
 Ricardo Mollo (born 1957), Argentine rock musician
 Victor Mollo (1909–1987), British contract bridge player, journalist and author
 Andrew Mollo (born 1940), French footballer
 Pasquale Mollo (born 1953)
International talent agent based in Italy and America 
 Ryan-Angelo Mollo (born 1999), Former President of Phi Alpha Theta Carthage College Chapter.